"Is It Me?" is a song performed by American contemporary R&B singer Monteco, issued as the first single from his debut studio album Soulschool. The song features vocals from American contemporary R&B group IMx (then known as Immature); and it was Monteco's only song to chart on Billboard, peaking at #32 on the R&B chart in 1995.

Chart positions

References

External links
 
 

1995 songs
1995 debut singles
IMx songs
MCA Records singles
Monteco songs
Songs written by Chris Stokes (director)